James Archibald Duncan (1858–1911) was a British lawyer and a Liberal politician
who briefly represented the seat of Barrow-in-Furness.

Duncan was born in Valparaiso, the son of the shipper David Duncan and his wife  Catherine Williamson.
The family moved to Gayton Hall, Wirral, Cheshire and Duncan was educated at Amersham Hall and Trinity College, Cambridge. He was called to the bar in 1883 and became a barrister of the Inner Temple. In 1890 he was elected as Member of Parliament for Barrow-in-Furness which had been briefly his father's seat. However he lost the seat two years later in 1892.

Duncan was unmarried. His nephew  Sir James Duncan was also an MP and became a baronet.

References

External links 
 
 Clan Duncan Society - Duncans of Jordanstone

1858 births
1911 deaths
Liberal Party (UK) MPs for English constituencies
UK MPs 1886–1892